Aigul is a popular Turkic feminine given name, which means "moon" and "flower".

Given name 
Aigul Jeenbekova (born 1968), First Lady of Kyrgyzstan
Aigul Japarova (born 1973), First Lady of Kyrgyzstan
Aigul Gareeva (born 2001), Russian racing cyclist

Variation name 
Aygül Özkan (born 1971), Is a German politician of the Christian Democratic Union (CDU)

References

Arabic given names
Arabic feminine given names
Hebrew feminine given names